The 2015–16 Rice Owls women's basketball team represents Rice University during the 2015–16 NCAA Division I women's basketball season. The Owls, led by first year head coach Tina Langley, play their home games at the Tudor Fieldhouse and were members of Conference USA. They finished the season 9–22, 7–11 in C-USA play to finish in a 3 way tie for eighth place. They advanced to the quarterfinals of the C-USA women's tournament where they lost to Middle Tennessee.

Roster

Rankings

Schedule

|-
!colspan=9 style="background:#002469; color:#5e6062;"| Non-conference regular season

|-
!colspan=9 style="background:#002469; color:#5e6062;"| Conference USA regular season

|-
!colspan=9 style="background:#002469; color:#5e6062;"|Conference USA Women's Tournament

See also
2015–16 Rice Owls men's basketball team

References

Rice Owls women's basketball seasons
Rice